Henderson County Schools may refer to:

 Henderson County Public Schools in North Carolina
 Henderson County Schools (Kentucky)
 Henderson County Schools (Tennessee)